Frank Smith (year of birth unknown), also known by the nickname of "Cheyenne" (after his facial similarity to the character Cheyenne Bodie in the TV series Cheyenne played by Clint Walker), is a former professional rugby league footballer who played in the 1950s and 1960s.

Playing career

International honours
Frank Smith played , i.e. number 2, in Rest of the League's 16–21 defeat by Great Britain in pre-1960 Rugby League World Cup warm-up match, in aid of the George VI's Jubilee Trust, at Knowsley Road, St. Helens on Monday 12 September 1960.

County honours
Frank Smith won a cap for Yorkshire while at Castleford playing right-, i.e. number 3, in the 13-15 defeat by Cumberland at Belle Vue, Wakefield on 25 September 1963.

County League appearances
Frank Smith played in Castleford's victory in the Yorkshire County League during the 1964–65 season.

County Cup Final appearances
Frank Smith played , i.e. number 2, in Featherstone Rovers' 15-14 victory over Hull F.C. in the 1959–60 Yorkshire County Cup Final during the 1959–60 season at Headingley Rugby Stadium, Leeds on Saturday 31 October 1959, in front of a crowd of 23,983.

Club career
Frank Smith made his début for Featherstone Rovers on Saturday 26 January 1957, and he played his last match for Featherstone Rovers during the 1960–61 season.

Genealogical information
Frank Smith is the son of the rugby league footballer; Frank Smith Sr.

References

External links
Search for "Smith" at rugbyleagueproject.org
Frank Smith Memory Box Search at archive.castigersheritage.com

Castleford Tigers players
English rugby league players
Featherstone Rovers players
Rugby league centres
Rugby league wingers
Yorkshire rugby league team players
Place of birth missing
Place of death missing
Year of birth missing
Year of death missing